Richard Alan Brooks (born 14 June 1943) at Edgware, Middlesex, known as Dickie Brooks is an English former cricketer who played first-class cricket for Oxford University and Somerset.

Brooks was educated at Quintin School in St John's Wood and St Edmund Hall, Oxford. A lower-order right-handed batsman and wicketkeeper, he won a Blue for cricket in 1967, and was then offered a contract with Somerset, the county having just parted company with its regular wicketkeeper Geoff Clayton. Brooks kept wicket tidily for Somerset for the whole of the 1968 season, but at the end of it he was offered a teaching post at Bradfield College and gave up the first-class game.

References

1943 births
Living people
English cricketers
Oxford University cricketers
Somerset cricketers
Berkshire cricketers
People educated at Quintin Kynaston School
Alumni of St Edmund Hall, Oxford
Cricketers from Greater London
Wicket-keepers